Italy competed at the 1974 European Athletics Championships in Rome, Norway, from 2 to 8 September 1974.

Medalists

Top eight

Men

Women

See also
 Italy national athletics team

References

External links
 EAA official site

Italy at the European Athletics Championships
Nations at the 1974 European Athletics Championships
1974 in Italian sport